Jøkulskarvet Ridge is a large mountainous ridge with an ice-capped summit, just northeast of Høgfonna Mountain in the Borg Massif of Queen Maud Land. It was mapped by Norwegian cartographers from surveys and from air photos by the Norwegian–British–Swedish Antarctic Expedition (1949–52) and named Jøkulskarvet (the glacier mountain).

Features
Bingen Cirque
Bommen Spur
Breidskaret Pass
Jøkulgavlen Ridge, a prominent ridge forming the south part of Jokulskarvet Ridge
Svellnuten Peak

References

External links

Ridges of Queen Maud Land
Princess Martha Coast